Ivan Viktorovich Temnikov (born 28 January 1989) is a Russian footballer who plays as right back for Ufa.

Career
Temnikov primarily plays as a right defender or right midfielder. He made his professional debut in the Russian Premier League for Saturn Moscow Oblast on 14 July 2007 in a game against FC Luch-Energiya Vladivostok. After spells at Ekaterinburg and Bryansk Temnikov signed for Rubin, but made only 1 league appearance and went to Grozny on loan, initially for 6 months. Later loan agreement was extended, and Temnikov stayed at Terek for the second part of 2013–14 season.

On 4 July 2019, he left FC Dynamo Moscow by mutual consent.

Career statistics

Honours
Torpedo Moscow
 Russian Football National League : 2021-22

Notes

External links

References

1989 births
People from Bratsk
Sportspeople from Irkutsk Oblast
Living people
Russian footballers
Russia youth international footballers
Russia under-21 international footballers
Russia national football B team footballers
Association football fullbacks
Association football wingers
FC Saturn Ramenskoye players
FC Ural Yekaterinburg players
FC Dynamo Bryansk players
FC Rubin Kazan players
FC Akhmat Grozny players
FC Tom Tomsk players
FC Dynamo Moscow players
FC Nizhny Novgorod (2015) players
FC Torpedo Moscow players
FC Ufa players
Russian Premier League players
Russian First League players